Geophagus is a genus of cichlids that mainly live in South America as far south as Argentina and Uruguay, but a single species, G. crassilabris is from Panama. They are found in a wide range of freshwater habitats. They are part of a group popularly known as eartheaters and mostly feed by picking up mouthfuls of sediment to sift out food items such as invertebrates, plant material and detritus. They are often kept in aquariums.

As an invasive species
Geophagus Surinamensis was an invasive species in Malaysia, recently found in Putrajaya, the populations are now controlled by giant snakeheads.

Taxonomy

Some cichlids previously included in this genus have been reallocated to Biotodoma, Gymnogeophagus or Satanoperca. Even with these as separate genera, Geophagus is currently polyphyletic and in need of further taxonomic revision. There are three main groups:

 Geophagus sensu stricto are mostly relatively peaceful, often have long fin extensions and are native to the Amazon, Orinoco and Parnaíba basins, as well as rivers of the Guianas. This group can be divided into two subgroups: The first is the G. surinamensis complex, which includes most species (fish in the aquarium trade often are identified as G. surinamensis itself, but they are typically other members of this complex.) The second subgroup contains G. argyrostictus, G. gottwaldi, G. grammepareius, G. harreri and G. taeniopareius, which are somewhat less peaceful and can be separated from the G. surinamensis complex by their dark stripe below the eye (however, this feature is shared with the next group).
 G. brasiliensis complex (including G. diamantinensis, G. iporangensis, G. itapicuruensis, G. multiocellus, G. obscurus, G. rufomarginatus and G. santosi) are more robust and aggressive species found in river basins of eastern and southeastern Brazil, Uruguay and northeastern Argentina.
 G. steindachneri complex (including G. crassilabris and G. pellegrini and undescribed species entering the aquarium trade from Colombia) found west of the Andes in northern and western Colombia, northwestern Venezuela and Panama where adult males develop a distinct, bulbous red forehead.

Species
[[File:Geophagus surinamensis - Blue Reef Aquarium Newquay.jpg|thumb| Geophagus pyrocephalus also known as Geophagus sp. "orange head" from the Tapajós River.  The new species of Geophagus naming a cichlid species in 2022] ]] 

There are currently 32 recognized species in this genus. Additionally, plus the species already described in 2022 that are known.[https://www.researchgate.net/publication/364309841_A_new_species_of_Geophagus_Teleostei_Cichlidae_Naming_a_cichlid_species_widely_known_in_the_aquarium_hobby_as_'Geophagus_sp_Tapajos_red_head  The new species of Geophagus naming a cichlid species in 2022

 Geophagus abalios López-Fernández & Taphorn, 2004
 Geophagus altifrons Heckel, 1840
 Geophagus argyrostictus S. O. Kullander, 1991
 Geophagus brachybranchus S. O. Kullander & Nijssen, 1989
 Geophagus brasiliensis (Quoy & Gaimard, 1824) (Pearl cichlid)
 Geophagus brokopondo S. O. Kullander & Nijssen, 1989
 Geophagus camopiensis Pellegrin, 1903 (Oyapock eartheater)
 Geophagus crassilabris Steindachner, 1876 (Panamanian eartheater)
 Geophagus crocatus Hauser & López-Fernández, 2013
 Geophagus diamantinensis Mattos, W. J. E. M. Costa & A. C. A. Santos, 2015
 Geophagus dicrozoster López-Fernández & Taphorn, 2004
 Geophagus gottwaldi I. Schindler & Staeck, 2006
 Geophagus grammepareius S. O. Kullander & Taphorn, 1992
 Geophagus harreri J. P. Gosse, 1976 (Maroni eartheater)
 Geophagus iporangensis Haseman, 1911
 Geophagus itapicuruensis Haseman, 1911
 Geophagus megasema Heckel, 1840
 Geophagus mirabilis Deprá, S. O. Kullander, Pavanelli & da Graça, 2014
 Geophagus multiocellus Mattos & W. J. E. M. Costa, 2018
 Geophagus neambi P. H. L. Lucinda, C. A. S. de Lucena & Assis, 2010
 Geophagus obscurus (Castelnau, 1855)
 Geophagus parnaibae Staeck & I. Schindler, 2006
 Geophagus pellegrini Regan, 1912 (Yellowhump eartheater)
 Geophagus proximus (Castelnau, 1855)
 Geophagus pyrocephalus 
 Geophagus rufomarginatus Mattos & W. J. E. M. Costa, 2018
 Geophagus santosi Mattos & W. J. E. M. Costa, 2018
 Geophagus steindachneri C. H. Eigenmann & Hildebrand, 1922 (Redhump eartheater)
 Geophagus surinamensis (Bloch, 1791) (Red-striped eartheater)
 Geophagus sveni P. H. F. Lucinda, C. A. S. de Lucena & Assis, 2010
 Geophagus taeniopareius S. O. Kullander & Royero-L., 1992
 Geophagus winemilleri López-Fernández & Taphorn, 2004

References

 
Geophagini
Cichlid fish of South America
Cichlid genera
Taxa named by Johann Jakob Heckel